Milovan Kapor (born 5 August 1991) is a Canadian professional soccer player who last played as a centre-back for RSC Hamsik Academy.

Club career
In 2012, he played in the USL Premier Development League with Bradenton Academics, and the following season with Baltimore Bohemians. He made his professional debut for Dukla Banská Bystrica against Spartak Trnava on 6 March 2015. In 2016, Kapor joined ViOn Zlaté Moravce.

On 10 August 2020, Kapor signed with Canadian Premier League side Atlético Ottawa. He made his debut on August 15 against York9.

International career
On June 6, 2017 Kapor was named to Canada's 40-man preliminary roster for the 2017 CONCACAF Gold Cup.

References

External links
 
 

1991 births
Living people
Association football defenders
Canadian soccer players
Soccer players from Toronto
Canadian people of Serbian descent
Canadian expatriate soccer players
UMBC Retrievers men's soccer players
IMG Academy Bradenton players
Baltimore Bohemians players 
Cádiz CF players
FK Dukla Banská Bystrica players
FK Železiarne Podbrezová players
FC ViOn Zlaté Moravce players
Hapoel Hadera F.C. players
FC Gomel players
Buxoro FK players
Atlético Ottawa players
FK Pohronie players
RSC Hamsik Academy players
USL League Two players
Slovak Super Liga players
Liga Leumit players
Belarusian Premier League players
Uzbekistan Super League players
Canadian Premier League players
Expatriate soccer players in the United States
Expatriate footballers in Spain
Expatriate footballers in Slovakia
Expatriate footballers in Israel
Expatriate footballers in Belarus
Expatriate footballers in Uzbekistan
Canadian expatriate sportspeople in the United States
Canadian expatriate sportspeople in Spain
Canadian expatriate sportspeople in Slovakia
Canadian expatriate sportspeople in Israel
Canadian expatriate sportspeople in Belarus
Canadian expatriate sportspeople in Uzbekistan